National Highway 319 (NH 319) is a  National Highway in India. This highway connects Mohania and Arrah in the state of Bihar.

References

National highways in India
National Highways in Bihar